Getti or Geti or Gatti may refer to:
 Getti, Hormozgan
 Gatti, Khash, Sistan and Baluchestan Province
 Gatti, Nik Shahr, Sistan and Baluchestan Province
 Gatti, Qasr-e Qand, Sistan and Baluchestan Province

See also
Arturo Gatti (1972–2009), Italian Canadian professional boxer